Chad-e Pain (also Romanized as Chād-e Pā’īn and Chad-e Pā’īn; also known as Chādūk) is a village in Birk Rural District, in the Central District of Mehrestan County, Sistan and Baluchestan Province, Iran. At the 2006 census, its population was 58, in 13 families.

References 

Populated places in Mehrestan County